Dr. Juan C. Stockert (March 15, 1940) is an Argentine physician and doctor of medicine. He was awarded with doctorates honoris causa (National University of Río Cuarto, and University of Buenos Aires), and research fellowships from the Argentine Association for Cancer Research, International Agency for Research on Cancer, and Alexander von Humboldt Stiftung. He was head of the Department of Cytology and Histology, professor of master programs in Genetics and Cell Biology, and scientific member of the High Council for Scientific Research, Spain.

Stockert belongs to the Editorial Board of Acta Histochemica, Biocell, Biotechnic and Histochemistry, Brazilian Journal of Morphological Sciences, Current Medicinal Chemistry, Internacional Journal of Biomedical Science, and Veterinary Research.

References 

1940 births
Living people
Argentine physicians
University of Buenos Aires alumni